John Stevenson may refer to:

Entertainment
John Andrew Stevenson (1761–1833), Irish composer
Steve Brodie (actor) (John Stevenson, 1919–1992), American actor
John Stevenson (writer) (born 1930), British writer of erotic fiction
John Stevenson (scriptwriter) (born 1937), British journalist and writer
John R. Stevenson, scriptwriter
John Stephenson (actor) (1923–2015), sometimes credited as John Stevenson
John Stevenson (director) (born 1958), British-American film director (Kung Fu Panda)

Military
John Dunlap Stevenson (1821–1897), Union Civil War general
John D. Stevenson (United States Air Force general) (1914–1995), U.S. Air Force general
John H. Stevenson (died 1899), member of the United States Navy during the American Civil War and the Spanish–American War
John Rowlstone Stevenson (1908–1971), Australian Army officer and a parliamentary officer

Politics
John W. Stevenson (1812–1886), Governor of Kentucky and U.S. Senator
John Stevenson (Wisconsin politician) (1835–1908), member of the Wisconsin State Assembly
John Stevenson (Ontario politician) (1812–1884), member of Parliament of Ontario
John Stevenson (Saskatchewan politician) (1873–1956), Saskatchewan politician and Senator
John Stevenson (Manitoba politician) (1848–?), member of Legislative Assembly of Manitoba
John Stevenson (Queensland politician) (1843–1912), Australian politician
John Stevenson (British politician) (born 1963), MP for Carlisle

Sports
John Stevenson (footballer, born 1862) (1862–?), Scottish footballer for Accrington
John Stevenson (footballer, born 1898) (1898–1979), English/Scottish footballer (Ayr United, Nelson St Johnstone, Falkirk) 
John Stevenson (Queen's Park footballer), footballer who played for Queen's Park
John Stevenson (cricketer) (1888–1951), English cricketer

Other people
John Stevenson (doctor) (died 1785), Scottish-born merchant and doctor in Baltimore, Maryland
John W. Stevenson (minister) (1835–1898), American African Methodist Episcopal church minister
John Stevenson (mycologist) (1836–1903), Scottish minister and mycologist

See also
John Stephenson (disambiguation)
J. J. Stevenson (1831–1908), British architect
John Hall-Stevenson (1718–1785), English country gentleman and writer
Jon Stevenson (born 1982), English footballer